Adrian Dawson (born 26 January 1971) is a British author of thriller and horror fiction, currently best known for his 2010 debut novel, Codex.

Codex was written in 1999, and Dawson was signed to the Christopher Little Literary Agency on the strength of the novel, but they failed to find a publisher. Codex deals with cryptology, religion and high-end technology, with one publisher stating that most readers would turn to non-fiction, rather than fiction, for such subject matter. With the advent of the iPad, Dawson's novel was published in ebook format, where it achieved a place on the UK iBook Store's Best Seller list and was printed in November 2010.

Dawson's second Novel Sequence was released in the UK on 5 September 2011 to wide critical acclaim, with SciFi Now magazine, calling Dawson "the new kid on the Block" and Terry Halligan of Euro-Crime saying that Sequence is "a very powerful story, of an intensity which makes it the best that I've read this year".

References

Other sources
This Is Nottingham: Nottingham author's book Codex pulled from Apple's iPad after sudden success
Peter Millar's review of "Sequence" in The Times

External links

British thriller writers
British horror writers
British science fiction writers
Living people
1971 births